The 1984 Stafford by-election was a parliamentary by-election held on 3 May 1984 for the British House of Commons constituency of Stafford.

Previous MP 
The seat fell vacant when the constituency's Conservative Member of Parliament (MP), Major Sir Hugh Charles Patrick Joseph Fraser MBE (23 January 1918 – 6 March 1984) died. Fraser was then one of Parliament’s most senior members, having served over 38 years in the House of Commons.

Fraser was educated at Ampleforth College, Balliol College, Oxford, where he was President of the Oxford Union, and at the Sorbonne. He was commissioned into the Lovat Scouts in 1936 and during World War II saw service in North Africa and Europe; he retired in the 1950s with the rank of Major.

Fraser was elected Member of Parliament for Stone in 1945, later Stafford and Stone following constituency boundary changes, from 1950 until 1983, and then Stafford until his death.

Candidates 
Four candidates were nominated. The list below is set out in descending order of the number of votes received at the by-election.

1. The Conservative candidate was William Nigel Paul Cash (born on 10 May 1940), a solicitor.

He has served continuously in the House of Commons since winning the by-election (as of July 2017). Cash represented Stafford, until boundary changes took effect in 1997. Since then he has been returned as MP for Stone.

2. The Social Democratic Party (SDP) candidate, representing the SDP-Liberal Alliance, was David Joseph Dunn. He was a senior lecturer in International Relations, at the time of the by-election. He was born in 1946 and had contested the seat in the 1983 general election.

3. Michael John David Poulter was the Labour candidate. He worked as a senior probation officer and was born in 1942. He contested Stafford and Stone in 1979 and this constituency in 1983.

4. Christopher David Teasdale was an Independent, using the ballot paper label "Soon to be unemployed".

Votes

See also
 Stafford constituency
 List of United Kingdom by-elections
 United Kingdom by-election records

External links
Campaign literature from the by-election

Sources

 Britain Votes/Europe Votes By-Election Supplement 1983-, compiled and edited by F.W.S. Craig (Parliamentary Research Services 1985)

Stafford by-election
Stafford by-election
By-elections to the Parliament of the United Kingdom in Staffordshire constituencies
Stafford
20th century in Staffordshire
Stafford by-election